Korab may refer to:

Korab, a mountain range in the Balkans
Mount Korab, the highest mountain in the Korab
Korab (given name), an Albanian masculine given name
Korab (surname), a Polish surname
Korab, Greater Poland Voivodeship, a village in west-central Poland
Korab (deity), a Slavic god of the sea